Good Advice is a 2001 comedy film starring Charlie Sheen, Angie Harmon, and Denise Richards. The film also features Jon Lovitz and Rosanna Arquette as a married couple in supporting roles.

Plot
Ryan Turner is a hotshot broker living an upscale life in NYC with his shallow girlfriend Cindy Styne. One morning, he is playing golf with the owner of one of the biggest newspaper publishers of New York. He tells Ryan of a huge merger between his company, Simpson Inc., and a large drug corporation. Ryan, ecstatic that this could be his big break, informs all his clients of the huge deal that is going to happen and they all place large amounts of money into the merger. 

However, the next day, Simpson reveals that there is not going to be a merger. Ryan loses most of his own, and much of his clients' money in light of the news. Storming over to Simpson's office, Simpson tells him he personally screwed him over as payback for sleeping with his wife. Ryan, now near bankrupt, sells his possessions and moves in with his girlfriend, Cindy. 

Ryan tries to get another job at another brokerage, but his license is revoked. Devastated, he loafs around, until Cindy tells him that she is leaving for Brazil with another man, dumping Ryan who she now considers "a loser" for time better spent with the (alleged) diamond mine owner.

Cindy was working at a small newspaper as an advice columnist. Ryan, as he can't get another job anywhere else, lies to the editor Page Hensen and takes over the column. Inexperienced at caring and giving solid advice, Ryan does poorly at first, and Page wants to get rid of "Cindy". However, he makes a real effort and begins giving good advice to the people writing in. The column turns into a huge hit and Page's newspaper begins to sell more and more across the city. 

Now, many people want to interview Cindy, but Ryan either tells them she does not give interviews or just sends them to the door. He begins to develop feelings for Page, feelings which turn out to be mutual, and they sleep together. 

However, things didn't go so well for Cindy, and she comes back into town. Simpson, who now wants Cindy's column for his own paper, is interested in buying. Ryan and Page are caught in bed, and reveal everything to Cindy. However, she blackmails them, and moves to Simpson's company. 

Ryan uses his brokerage skills to make money off the combination of Cindy and Simpson. Inevitably, she ruins the whole transaction, as she is incapable of the compassionate advice that Ryan was offering in her stead, and Simpson's stock plummets. Ryan and Page are engaged, and Ryan has since become a successful columnist in his own right.

Cast
 Charlie Sheen as Ryan Turner
 Denise Richards as Cindy Styne
 Angie Harmon as Page Hensen
 Jon Lovitz as Barry Sherman
 Rosanna Arquette as Cathy Sherman
 Barry Newman as Donald Simpson
 Estelle Harris as Iris
 John DeLancie as Ted

References

External links

 

2001 films
2001 romantic comedy films
American independent films
American romantic comedy films
Films directed by Steve Rash
Films scored by Teddy Castellucci
MoviePass Films films
2001 independent films
2000s English-language films
2000s American films